Melissa S. Williams (born 1960) is an American academic who specialises in democratic theory and comparative political theory. She was the founding director of the University of Toronto's Centre for Ethics. As of 2018, she is a professor in the Department of Political Science at the University of Toronto.

She gained an MESc from Bryn Mawr College, and AM and PhD degrees from Harvard University. Her doctoral advisers were Judith Shklar and Dennis F. Thompson. Her PhD thesis won the American Political Science Association's Leo Strauss Award.

A major work is the book Voice, Trust, and Memory: Marginalized Groups and the Failings of Liberal Representation, published by Princeton University Press (1998), which won a First Book Award in political theory or political philosophy from the American Political Science Association in 1999. She has served as editor of the journal NOMOS of the American Society for Political and Legal Philosophy.

Selected publications
Books
Joseph Chan,  Doh Chull Shin, Melissa S. Williams, eds. East Asian Perspectives on Political Legitimacy: Bridging the Empirical-Normative Divide (Cambridge University Press; 2016) 
Melissa Williams. Equality: A Critical Introduction (Routledge; 2014) 
David Kahane, Daniel Weinstock, Dominique Leydet, Melissa Williams, eds. Deliberative Democracy in Practice (University of British Columbia Press; 2010) 
Melissa S. Williams. Voice, Trust, and Memory: Marginalized Groups and the Failings of Liberal Representation (Princeton University Press; 1998, 2000) 
Essays and research papers
Melissa S. Williams. "Citizenship as Identity, Citizenship as Shared Fate, and the Functions of Multicultural Education" in Kevin McDonough, Walter Feinberg (eds), Citizenship and Education in Liberal-Democratic Societies: Teaching for Cosmopolitan Values and Collective Identities (Oxford University Press; 2003) 
Melissa S. Williams (1995). Justice toward groups: Political not juridical. Political Theory 23: 67–91

References 

Living people
1960 births
Bryn Mawr College alumni
Harvard University alumni
Academic staff of the University of Toronto
Canadian political philosophers